Automeris is a genus of moths in the family Saturniidae and the subfamily Hemileucinae. As of 1996 there were 124 species, and more have since been described. These moths are generally characterized by the eyelike patches on the hindwings and the leaflike pattern on the forewings, an example of crypsis. The genus was first described by Jacob Hübner in 1819 and it is distributed in the Neotropical realm.

List of species

Gallery

References

Hemileucinae
Moth genera